Dalto (De Aanval Leidt Tot Overwinning) is a Dutch korfball club located in Driebergen, Netherlands. The club was founded on 1 April 1953 and they play their home games in sport accommodation Hoenderdaal. The team plays yellow shirts and black shorts / skirts.

History

Dalto has been a founding member of Korfbal League and was relegated for the first time in season 2015/2016.

Current squad

References

External links
 Dalto Official website

Korfball teams in the Netherlands